Centennial Correctional Facility (CCF) is a prison located in the East Canon complex in Fremont County, just east of Canon City, Colorado. CCF consists of two separate buildings, North and South. The South facility, opened in 2011, is a Level V maximum security facility. All offenders in CCF South are in Administrative Segregation (AdSeg), also known as solitary confinement. CCF South is the counterpart of the Colorado State Penitentiary (CSP), also in the East Canon complex. The North facility is the original facility, and primarily houses Level IV maximum security offenders.

References

External links 
 Official website

Prisons in Colorado
Buildings and structures in Fremont County, Colorado
1980 establishments in Colorado